WKXN (95.7 FM, "The Big KD") is a radio station licensed to the community of Fort Deposit, Alabama, United States, and serving the Montgomery, Alabama, area.  The station is owned by Autaugaville Radio, Inc. It airs an urban adult contemporary music format. The station's programming is simulcast by sister station WKXK.

The station was assigned the WKXN call letters by the Federal Communications Commission for its initial launch in 1977.

In September 1994, original owners WKXN, Inc., made a deal to sell this station to Autaugaville Radio, Inc.  The deal was approved by the FCC on November 17, 1994, and the transaction was consummated on November 23, 1994.

Translators
WKXN previously broadcast into Montgomery via a translator, W300AN at 107.9. This ended when class C3 outlet WMRK-FM signed on at that frequency in April 2009. A change of frequency to 102.7 was later approved, and it became W274BG.

References

External links

The Big Station - DJs and Nosey Neighbors in Montgomery, Alabama (website for film about WKXN/WKXK)

KXN
Urban adult contemporary radio stations in the United States
Radio stations established in 1977
1977 establishments in Alabama
Butler County, Alabama